Giyani Stadium is a multi-use stadium in Giyani, South Africa.  It is used mostly for football matches, but is also used as a large-scale concert venue, and is the home ground of Dynamos F.C. of South Africa's National First Division.  The stadium has a capacity of 20,000 people.

References

External links
Venue information
Photos of Stadiums in South Africa at cafe.daum.net/stade

Soccer venues in South Africa
Sports venues in Limpopo
Dynamos F.C. (South Africa)